Skärholmen is a borough (stadsdelsområde) of Söderort in the southern part of Stockholm.

Overview
It is primarily made up of Skärholmen parish. The districts that make up the borough are Bredäng, Skärholmen, Sätra and Vårberg. The population  is 33,662 on an area of 8.86 km², which gives a density of 3,800/km².

References

External links

Boroughs of Stockholm